The 2017 Balkan Athletics Championships was the 76th edition of the annual track and field competition for athletes from the Balkans, organised by Balkan Athletics. It was held at Novi Pazar Athletics Stadium in Novi Pazar, Serbia on 15 and 16 July. The host nation Serbia won the most titles at the competition, with nine, and also shared the highest medal total with Romania, at 21. Romania finished top of the team points table.

Results

Men

Women

Medal table

Participation

References

Results
76th Balkan Athletics Championships. Balkan Athletics. Retrieved 2019-08-03.

2017
Novi Pazar
Sport in Šumadija and Western Serbia
International athletics competitions hosted by Serbia
Balkan Athletics Championships
Balkan Athletics Championships
Balkan Athletics Championships